The Jin–Song Wars were a series of armed conflicts conducted by the Jurchen-led Jin dynasty and the Song dynasty in the 12th and 13th centuries. The Jurchens were a Tungusic–speaking tribal confederation native to Manchuria. They overthrew the Khitan-led Liao dynasty in 1122 and declared the establishment of a new dynasty, the Jin. Diplomatic relations between the Jin and Song deteriorated, and the Jurchens first declared war on the Song dynasty in November 1125.

Two armies were dispatched against the Song. One army captured the provincial capital of Taiyuan, while the other besieged the Song capital of Kaifeng. The Jin withdrew when the Song promised to pay an annual indemnity. As the Song dynasty weakened, the Jin armies conducted a second siege against Kaifeng. The city was captured and looted, and the Song dynasty emperor, Emperor Qinzong, was imprisoned and taken north to Manchuria as a hostage. The remainder of the Song court retreated to southern China, beginning the Southern Song period of Chinese history. Two puppet governments, first the Da Chu dynasty and later the state of Qi, were established by the Jin as buffer states between the Song and Manchuria.

The Jin marched southward with the aim of conquering the Southern Song, but counteroffensives by Chinese generals like Yue Fei halted their advance. A peace accord, the Treaty of Shaoxing, was negotiated and ratified in 1142, establishing the Huai River as the boundary between the two empires. Peace between the Song and Jin was interrupted twice. Wanyan Liang invaded the Southern Song in 1161, while Song revanchists tried and failed to retake northern China in 1204.

The Jin–Song Wars were notable for the appearance of new technological innovations. The siege of De'an in 1132 included the first recorded use of the fire lance, an early gunpowder weapon and an ancestor of the firearm. The huopao, an incendiary bomb, was employed in a number of battles and gunpowder bombs made of cast iron were used in a siege in 1221. The Jurchens migrated south and settled in northern China, where they adopted the language and Confucian culture of the local inhabitants. The Jin dynasty government grew into a centralized imperial bureaucracy structured in the same manner as previous dynasties of China. Both the Song and Jin dynasties ended in the 13th century as the Mongol Empire expanded across Asia.

Campaigns against the Northern Song

Campaigns against the Southern Song

After the peace treaty

See also
 History of the Song dynasty

Notes

References

Citations

Sources 

 
 
 
 
 
 
 
 

Jin-Song